Sharion Marie Aycock (born December 19, 1955) is an American attorney and jurist serving as a United States district judge of the United States District Court for the Northern District of Mississippi. She served as the chief judge from 2014 to 2021 and has been on the court since 2007. She is the first female federal district court judge in Mississippi.

Early life and education

Aycock was born in Tupelo, Mississippi and raised in Tremont. She received a Bachelor of Arts degree in economics from Mississippi State University with a minor in political science in 1977. She received a Juris Doctor from Mississippi College School of Law in 1980, where she graduated second in the class and was co-editor-in-chief of the Mississippi College Law Review. She became a member of the Mississippi Bar in 1980.

Career

Aycock worked in private practice in Mississippi from 1980 to 2003 with two firms and as a solo practitioner. Aycock served as the Itawamba County prosecuting attorney from 1984 to 1992. She was a circuit court judge on the First Circuit Court of Mississippi from 2003 to 2007.

Aycock was nominated by President George W. Bush on March 19, 2007, to a seat on the United States District Court for the Northern District of Mississippi vacated by Glen H. Davidson. She was unanimously confirmed by the United States Senate on October 4, 2007, and received her commission on October 22, 2007. She became chief judge on June 2, 2014. She is the first woman to be Chief Judge of the court in Mississippi. Her term as chief judge ended on June 11, 2021.

Personal life

Aycock is married to William R. "Randy" Aycock and has one son.

See also
List of first women lawyers and judges in Mississippi

References

External links

1955 births
Living people
21st-century American judges
21st-century American women judges
American women lawyers
American lawyers
Judges of the United States District Court for the Northern District of Mississippi
Mississippi College School of Law alumni
Mississippi lawyers
Mississippi state court judges
Mississippi State University alumni
People from Itawamba County, Mississippi
United States district court judges appointed by George W. Bush